Tamás von Márffy-Mantuano (March 20, 1907 – March 21, 1969) was a Hungarian field hockey player who competed in the 1936 Summer Olympics.

He was born in Rome, Italy and died in London, England.

In 1936, he was a member of the Hungarian team which was eliminated in the group stage of the Olympic tournament. He played two matches as forward.

External links
Tamás Márffy's profile at Sports Reference.com

1907 births
1969 deaths
Hungarian male field hockey players
Olympic field hockey players of Hungary
Field hockey players at the 1936 Summer Olympics
Austro-Hungarian expatriates in Italy
Hungarian emigrants to the United Kingdom